The Servicio de Publicaciones is the publishing business of the Universidad Complutense de Madrid. It publishes a number of academic journals, mostly in Spanish. There are also 9 series of monographs associated with these journals. The company also publishes in electronic format the honors doctoral theses of the university.

References

External links 
 

University presses of Spain
Companies with year of establishment missing
Complutense University of Madrid
Mass media in Madrid